Daniel Bram Haber (born May 20, 1992) is a Canadian retired soccer player who played as a forward. During a professional career that spanned six years, he appeared for Maccabi Haifa, Apollon Limassol, Ayia Napa, Hapoel Nir Ramat HaSharon, Whitecaps FC 2, Real Monarchs, Real Salt Lake, FC Cincinnati, and Ottawa Fury FC. Haber was capped five times by the Canadian national team.

Youth and college
Haber played three seasons for Cornell University, an Ivy League University in U.S. NCAA Division 1 soccer. In 2012, his junior year, Haber scored 18 goals and made 7 assists during the regular season and finished the year on top of the country in points per game and goals per game. In addition to leading the NCAA in scoring, in 2012 Haber was named a first-team All-American, Ivy League player of the year, and a finalist for the Hermann Trophy (U.S. college soccer's highest individual honour).

Club career

Maccabi Haifa
Haber signed with Maccabi Haifa in the Israeli Premier League in early January 2013, after he decided to forgo his senior year of eligibility at Cornell University. Although not playing any games in his first few months in Israel, he made the most of his limited minutes, scoring 2 goals in 4 games in his first professional season – his first goal coming against Ironi Ramat HaSharon on May 5, 2013.

Apollon Limassol
On June 24, 2013, Cyprus First Division side Apollon Limassol confirmed that Haber had signed a 1+1 year contract with them.  When interviewed, Haber stated that Haifa were interested in re-signing him, but he felt that this would be a good move for his young career, particularly with the opportunity of getting more playing time. Haber scored his first goal for the club on September 28, 2013, in a 2–1 win over Alki Larnaca. In the summer of 2014, he was loaned to the newly promoted top-flight side Ayia Napa for the 2014–15 season.

Loan to Ayia Napa
Haber was loaned to Ayia Napa for the 2014–15 season on July 2, 2014. He made his debut for the club on August 23 in a loss to Ethnikos Achnas. He would score his first goal for the team on August 31 in a draw against Doxa Katokopia.

Hapoel Nir Ramat HaSharon
On July 23, 2015 signed to Hapoel Nir Ramat HaSharon.

Whitecaps FC 2
Haber signed with Whitecaps FC 2 on January 27, 2016.

Real Monarchs
On November 17, 2016 Haber signed with United Soccer League side and Real Salt Lake 2nd team Real Monarchs.

FC Cincinnati
On November 15, 2017, Haber signed with FC Cincinnati for the 2018 United Soccer League season.

Ottawa Fury
On July 9, 2018, Haber joined United Soccer League side Ottawa Fury on a free transfer. After the 2018 season, the Fury would announce that Haber would not return to the Fury for the 2019 season.

International career
On May 23, 2013, Haber earned his first call up to the Canada men's national soccer team for a friendly in the following week against Costa Rica. Haber made his senior international debut on May 28, 2013, coming on as a second-half substitute for Issey Nakajima-Farran in a 1–0 defeat to Costa Rica at Commonwealth Stadium.

Haber's last international appearance was in a friendly against Moldova on May 27, 2014, which resulted in a 1–1 draw.

Career statistics

Club
Sources:

International
Sources:

References

External links

 
 Daniel Haber at FC Cincinnati
 
 

Living people
1992 births
Canadian soccer players
Soccer players from Toronto
Jewish Canadian sportspeople
Association football forwards
Cornell Big Red men's soccer players
Maccabi Haifa F.C. players
Apollon Limassol FC players
Ayia Napa FC players
Hapoel Nir Ramat HaSharon F.C. players
Whitecaps FC 2 players
Real Monarchs players
Real Salt Lake players
FC Cincinnati (2016–18) players
Ottawa Fury FC players
Israeli Premier League players
Cypriot First Division players
Liga Leumit players
USL Championship players
Canada men's international soccer players
Canadian expatriate soccer players
Canadian expatriate sportspeople in Israel
Expatriate footballers in Israel
Canadian expatriate sportspeople in Cyprus
Expatriate footballers in Cyprus
Canadian expatriate sportspeople in the United States
Expatriate soccer players in the United States
All-American men's college soccer players
Maccabiah Games footballers